Stéphanie Cohen-Aloro (born 18 March 1983) is a former professional tennis player from France.

Her career-high singles ranking is world No. 61, achieved on 5 October 2003. Her highest doubles ranking position of 54, she set on 18 July 2005.

Cohen-Aloro won seven singles and twelve doubles titles on tournaments of the ITF Circuit.

Professional career
Cohen-Aloro turned professional on 15 October 2001, at the age of 18.

In April 2005, she beat world No. 21, Daniela Hantuchová, in Miami in two sets. Cohen-Aloro upset heavy favorite Mary Pierce (seeded 24 and ranked No. 29 in the world) in the first round of the 2005 Australian Open, 6–2, 6–2.

Cohen-Aloro and Tunisian Selima Sfar pulled off a major upset in the first round of the 2005 Wimbledon Championships ladies' doubles, beating third seeds Lisa Raymond and Rennae Stubbs, 6–4, 3–6, 6–2. However, they lost in the second round.

In 2006, she captured her fifth career ITF singles title at the $25k Biarritz, and won the ninth ITF Circuit doubles title at the $50k Joué-lès-Tours with María José Martínez Sánchez.

On 12 February 2011, she played her last professional match, losing in the semifinals of the Open GDF Suez doubles event to Bethanie Mattek-Sands and Meghann Shaughnessy. Two days earlier in the same tournament, she had played her last singles match, losing to Mattek-Sands in the second round of the main draw.

WTA career finals

Doubles: 1 runner-up

ITF Circuit finals

Singles: 10 (7–3)

Doubles: 23 (12–11)

Personal
Cohen-Aloro is Jewish.

See also
 List of select Jewish tennis players

References

External links
 
 
 

1983 births
Living people
French female tennis players
21st-century French Jews
Jewish tennis players
Tennis players from Paris